Dietrich II was Count of Cleves from 1147 through 1172, son of Arnold I, Count of Cleves and Ida, the daughter of Godfrey I, Count of Louvain.

The County of Cleves was a comital polity of the Holy Roman Empire in present Germany (part of North Rhine-Westphalia) and the Netherlands (parts of Limburg, North Brabant and Gelderland). Its rulers, called counts, had a special and privileged standing in the Empire. The County of Cleves  was first mentioned in the 11th century. In 1417, the county became a duchy), and its rulers were raised to the status of Dukes.

Its history is closely related to that of its neighbours: the Duchies of Jülich, Berg and Guelders and the County of Mark. In 1368, Cleves and Mark were united. In 1521 Jülich, Berg, Cleves and Mark formed the United Duchies of Jülich-Cleves-Berg.  The territory was situated on both sides of the river Rhine, around its capital Cleves and roughly covering today's districts of Cleves, Wesel and the city of Duisburg.

He married Adelaide, the daughter of Gebhard III of Sulzbach and Matilda of Bavaria, they had the following issue:

Dietrich III, successor
 Adelaide
 Arnold (c.1155 – 1201) married Adelaide of Heinsberg

Counts of Cleves
Year of birth unknown
1172 deaths